Jasper Stuyven (born 17 April 1992) is a Belgian professional racing cyclist, who currently rides for UCI WorldTeam .

Career

Juniors
Born in Leuven, Stuyven had a successful career as a junior rider. In 2009, at age 17, he won the UCI Junior World Road Race Championships. 2010 brought Stuyven more successes when he won one day races Paris-Roubaix Juniors and Remouchamps–Ferrières–Remouchamps.

Early years

Trek Factory Racing (2014–present)

2014
Stuyven joined UCI WorldTeam  in 2014 at the age of 22. During this season, he rode in his first grand tour, the Vuelta a España. In this race, he earned fourth place in three stages and finished ninth in the points classification.

2015
2015 brought Stuyven his biggest victory yet, when he won stage 8 of the Vuelta a España in a reduced bunch sprint. Stuyven had been involved in a crash earlier in the stage and he was forced to withdraw from the race after the stage with a broken scaphoid.

2016

In 2016, he won the Belgian one-day race Kuurne–Brussels–Kuurne by breaking away solo for the last  of the race. Stuyven also earned a fifth place at the E3 Harelbeke. He was named in the start list for the Tour de France where he held the polka-dot jersey as leader of the mountains classification for two days.

2017
He rode in the Giro d'Italia. In stage six, Stuyven finished second behind Silvan Dillier of  after the pair had been part of a five-man breakaway that rode clear of the peloton for almost all of the  stage.

2018
In 2018, Stuyven finished in the top 10 in many of the spring classics, including 4th place in Omloop Het Nieuwsblad, and 5th in Paris–Roubaix, being part of the chase group with Sep Vanmarcke and defending champion Greg Van Avermaet. In September, he first won the Grand Prix de Wallonie, before winning his home town race in Leuven, the Grote Prijs Jef Scherens.

2019
In late August, Stuyven won the Deutschland Tour after taking the overall lead on stage 3. He carried his good form into the autumn classics with several top ten results, including two podium finishes at the Grand Prix de Wallonie and the Tour de l'Eurométropole.

2020
Before the COVID-19 pandemic shut down the 2020 road cycling season, Stuyven got off to a strong start. In the opening weekend of the Belgian road cycling season, he won Omloop Het Nieuwsblad, beating fellow Belgian Yves Lampaert in a two-up sprint, before finishing fifth in Kuurne–Brussels–Kuurne the day after. Once racing resumed, he bookended August with a pair of fifth-place finishes in the Circuito de Getxo on 2 August and then in the UEC European Road Championships road race on 26 August.

2021
On 20 March, Stuyven won Milan-San Remo for his first Monument victory. With three kilometers left, he attacked at the bottom of the descent of the Poggio, the last climb in the race. Many of the main pre-race favorites in the lead group were hesitant to chase him down, though Søren Kragh Andersen managed to bridge across to Stuyven in the final kilometer. With the group closing down the duo, Stuyven launched out of Kragh Andersen's slipstream in the last 200 meters. Though he was on his limit, he held on for the win on the line just ahead of the chasing group, led home by Caleb Ewan ahead of defending champion Wout van Aert.

Personal life
Stuyven studied at the Sint-Pieterscollege in Leuven. Outside of cycling, he and his uncle Ivan, an experienced chocolatier, run a small chocolate boutique in Betekom named Chocolade Atelier Stuyven that opened in 2016 and often produces many cycling-themed pieces.

Career achievements

Major results

2009
 1st  Road race, UCI Junior World Championships
 2nd Overall Giro della Toscana
 3rd Overall Driedaagse van Axel
 4th Overall Keizer der Juniores
2010
 1st Paris–Roubaix Juniors
 1st Remouchamps–Ferrières–Remouchamps
 1st Stage 4 3 Giorni Orobica
 3rd  Road race, UCI Junior Road World Championships
 4th Overall Driedaagse van Axel
1st Stage 3
2011
 2nd Paris–Roubaix Espoirs
2012
 1st Stage 3 Cascade Classic
 7th Grand Prix de Wallonie
2013
 1st  Overall Volta ao Alentejo
1st  Points classification
1st  Young rider classification
1st Stage 2
 1st Stage 1 Tour de Beauce
 3rd Grote Prijs Jef Scherens
 3rd Liège–Bastogne–Liège Espoirs
2015
 1st Stage 8 Vuelta a España
2016
 1st Kuurne–Brussels–Kuurne
 5th E3 Harelbeke
 9th Omloop Het Nieuwsblad
 Tour de France
Held  after Stages 2–4
 Combativity award Stage 2
2017
 2nd Kuurne–Brussels–Kuurne
 3rd Road race, National Road Championships
 3rd Overall BinckBank Tour
1st Stage 7
 4th Paris–Roubaix
 5th Brussels Cycling Classic
 6th Japan Cup
 7th Eschborn-Frankfurt – Rund um den Finanzplatz
 7th EuroEyes Cyclassics
 8th Omloop Het Nieuwsblad
2018
 1st Grand Prix de Wallonie
 1st Grote Prijs Jef Scherens
 2nd Brussels Cycling Classic
 3rd Road race, National Road Championships
 3rd Grand Prix Cycliste de Québec
 3rd Kampioenschap van Vlaanderen
 4th Omloop Het Nieuwsblad
 5th Paris–Roubaix
 6th E3 Harelbeke
 7th Tour of Flanders
 9th Gent–Wevelgem
 9th Halle–Ingooigem
 10th Overall BinckBank Tour
1st Stage 4
 10th Milan–San Remo
 10th Dwars door Vlaanderen
 10th Tour de l'Eurométropole
  Combativity award Stage 14 Tour de France
2019
 1st  Overall Deutschland Tour
 2nd Grand Prix de Wallonie
 3rd Tour de l'Eurométropole
 4th London–Surrey Classic
 5th Grand Prix Cycliste de Québec
 5th Brussels Cycling Classic
 6th Binche–Chimay–Binche
 6th Grand Prix de Fourmies
2020
 1st Omloop Het Nieuwsblad
 5th Road race, UEC European Road Championships
 5th Kuurne–Brussels–Kuurne
 5th Circuito de Getxo
2021
 1st Milan–San Remo
 3rd Paris–Tours
 3rd Primus Classic
 4th Road race, UCI Road World Championships  
 4th Tour of Flanders
 7th Overall Benelux Tour
 7th Bretagne Classic
 10th Dwars door Vlaanderen
2022
 4th Gent–Wevelgem
 7th Paris–Roubaix
 9th Overall Danmark Rundt
 9th Classic Brugge–De Panne
 10th Omloop Het Nieuwsblad
2023
 10th Milan–San Remo
 10th Kuurne–Brussels–Kuurne

Grand Tour general classification results timeline

Classics results timeline

Major championships timeline

References

External links

 

1992 births
Living people
Belgian male cyclists
Belgian Vuelta a España stage winners
Sportspeople from Leuven
Cyclists from Flemish Brabant
20th-century Belgian people
21st-century Belgian people